In control theory the settling time of a dynamical system such as an amplifier or other output device is the time elapsed from the application of an ideal instantaneous step input to the time at which the amplifier output has entered and remained within a specified error band. 

Settling time includes a propagation delay, plus the time required for the output to slew to the vicinity of the final value, recover from the overload condition associated with slew, and finally settle to within the specified error.

Systems with energy storage cannot respond instantaneously and will exhibit transient responses when they are subjected to inputs or disturbances.

Definition 

Tay, Mareels and Moore (1998) defined settling time as "the time required for the response curve to reach and stay within a range of certain percentage (usually 5% or 2%) of the final value."

Mathematical detail 

Settling time depends on the system response and natural frequency.

The settling time for a second order, underdamped system responding to a step response can be approximated if the damping ratio  by

A general form is

Thus, if the damping ratio , settling time to within 2% = 0.02 is:

See also
 Rise time
 Time constant

References

External links

 Second-Order System Example
 Op Amp Settling Time
 Graphical tutorial of Settling time and Risetime
 MATLAB function for computing settling time, rise time, and other step response characteristics
 Settling Time Calculator

Transient response characteristics
Systems_theory